G. Holmes Braddock Senior High School is a secondary school located in unincorporated Miami-Dade County, Florida, United States. The school is named after a former 38-year member of the school board, who, as chairperson from 1969 to 1970, led the district's efforts to desegregate its schools. This high school is a magnet school of choice. The magnet programs offered by this school are iPreparatory Academy, visual and performing arts, Cambridge University program, and information technology.

Demographics
Braddock is 91% Hispanic, 6% White non-Hispanic, 2% Black, and 1% Asian. 52% of the students are male. 48% of the students are female.

Curriculum
In 2006, Braddock began offering the Cambridge University curriculum used in the United Kingdom.

Notable alumni

 Sean Rodriguez, Major League Baseball player

See also

 Miami-Dade County Public Schools

References

External links
 Miami-Dade County public schools
 Official School Page

Educational institutions established in 1989
Magnet schools in Florida
Miami-Dade County Public Schools high schools
1989 establishments in Florida